Atlantic Christian School is a private, coeducational Christian school in Egg Harbor Township, in Atlantic County, New Jersey, United States, serving students in pre-kindergarten through twelfth grade. The school colors are green and white, and the mascot is the cougar. The school is dually accredited by the Middle States Association of Colleges and Schools (until July 2026) and by the Association of Christian Schools International.

As of the 2019–20 school year, the school had an enrollment of 365 students (plus 137 in PreK) and 47.8 classroom teachers (on an FTE basis), for a student–teacher ratio of 7.6:1. The school's student body was 58.6% (214) White, 14.0% (51) Black, 10.4% (38) two or more races, 10.1% (37) Hispanic and 6.6% (24) Asian. Tuition is $7,325 for grades 9-12 for 2022-23. After graduation, 75% of students go on to attend a four-year college.

History
Atlantic Christian School was founded in 1971 and first held classes in the Parish House of St. John's By the Sea in Ventnor City, New Jersey. For 33 years, the school operated out of leased facilities-in seven different churches and two public school buildings.

Atlantic Christian School opened a permanent school facility on a  campus in Egg Harbor Township in January 2004. A , two-story building provides classroom space, as well as a library/media center, computer and science labs, art and music rooms, a gymnasium, and a multi-purpose auditorium. Outdoor facilities include playgrounds and athletic fields for intramural and inter-scholastic soccer, baseball, softball, and track.

Atlantic Christian School is an interdenominational, independent school and is governed by a board of directors elected by the Atlantic Christian School Association. Over 100 churches are represented in the student body.

All full-time faculty teaching core curriculum subjects hold bachelor's degrees and average seven years of teaching experience. One-third of the faculty and staff hold master's degrees. All faculty are required to hold a New Jersey state certification and/or ACSI Christian school teacher certification. Teachers are encouraged to pursue opportunities for continuing education.

Atlantic Christian School is a member of the Association of Christian School International (ACSI) and its faculty, staff, and board members regularly attend ACSI training and development programs.

School organization
Atlantic Christian School is owned and operated by the Atlantic Christian School Association. The association is composed of Christians from many denominations who are school parents, faculty, staff, and community supporters and believe in the mission and ministry of the school. All Association members must agree with the school's Statement of Faith, which denies employment to individuals who identify with LGBTQ orientations.

A board of directors, elected by the association at its annual May meeting, determines the policies, procedures, and regulations for the operation and administration of the school. The Board also assists in raising funds for the school and monitors the performance of the school's administration. Board members come from a cross-section of disciplines and denominations. The term of service is three years. Board members may be re-elected for additional terms, not to exceed three consecutive terms.

Each board member has been a member of the ACS Association for at least one year. Board members or members of their immediate family may not hold a position as a paid staff member or administrator.

The Parent Teacher Fellowship (PTF) brings together parents and teachers to advance the welfare of the children and the school. The PTF sponsors social events to promote Christian fellowship, organizes fund-raisers to support specific school projects, and provides parents with opportunities to be involved in various volunteer activities.

References

External links
School website
privateschoolsreport.com
privateschoolreview.com

1971 establishments in New Jersey
Christian schools in New Jersey
Educational institutions established in 1971
Egg Harbor Township, New Jersey
Middle States Commission on Secondary Schools
Private K-12 schools in New Jersey
Private high schools in Atlantic County, New Jersey